Baltasar Porcel i Pujol (Andratx, Majorca, 14 March 1937 – Barcelona, 1 July 2009) was a Spanish writer, journalist and literary critic. His enormous legacy credited him as one of the greatest authors in Catalan literature from the 20th century.

Biography
He was born on 14 March 1937 in Andratx, Majorca. His catalan language works has been translated into Spanish, German, English, French, Italian and Vietnamese among others. He also won several literary prizes. As a journalist he worked in La Vanguardia, Última Hora and Catalunya Ràdio. Since 1960 he lived in both Barcelona and Majorca. He was the president of the Catalan Institute for the Mediterranean since 1989 to 2000. In 2001 he won the Ramon Llull Novel Award for L'emperador o l'ull del vent . In 2002 he won the National prize of Literature of Catalonia and in 2007 the Premi d'Honor de les Lletres Catalanes. He also received in Italy the Bocaccio Prize, in France the Prix Méditerranée and in the United States the Critic's Choice.

Porcel died on 1 July 2009 at the age of 72 after several years battling cancer.

Works

Novel 
 1961 Solnegre
 1963 La lluna i el Cala Llamp
 1965 Els escorpins
 1968 Els argonautes
 1970 Difunts sota els ametllers en flor
 1975 Cavalls cap a la fosca
 1980 Les pomes d'or
 1984 Els dies immortals
 1986 Les primaveres i les tardors
 1989 El divorci de Berta Barca
 1994 Lola i els peixos morts
 1997 Ulisses a alta mar
 2000 El cor del senglar
 2001 L'emperador o l'ull del vent
 2004 Olympia a mitjanit
 2008 Cada castell i totes les ombres

Essay 
 1967 Viatge literari a Mallorca
 1967 Arran de mar
 1968 Viatge a les Balears menors
 1969 Els xuetes
 1969 Exercicis més o menys espirituals
 1973 Debat català
 1977 Diàlegs
 1987 Els meus inèdits de Llorenç Villalonga
 1990 A totes les illes
 1993 Camprodon. Una vall del Pirineu.

Interviews 
 2003 L'àguila daurada

Literature biographies 
 1972 Grans catalans d'ara
 2002 El drama i la mar. Entrevista amb Jacint Verdaguer.

Travels 
 1971 Crònica d'atabalades navegacions
 1977 Camins i ombres
 1984 Les illes encantades
 1996 Mediterrània. Onatges tumultuosos.

Short novel 
 1979 Reivindicació de la vídua Txing
 1982 El misteri de l'alzinar i altres contes
 1984 Tots els contes
 2002 Les maniobres de l'amor: Tots els contes, 1958–2001

Theatre 
 1959 Els condemnats
 1962 La simbomba fosca
 1965 Teatre
 1981 Els dolços murmuris del mar

Complete works 
 1991–1997 Obres completes (7 volums)

As actor 
 1960 Els condemnats. València: Teatre Estudi.
 1962 La simbomba fosca. Companyia Agrupació Dramàtica de Barcelona.
 1962 Èxode. Barcelona: Companyia Teatre Experimental Català.
 1965 El general. Grup Sis x Set: Terrassa.
 1965 Romanç de cec. Grup Sis x Set: Terrassa.

Works for TV 
 El món en català.
 L'espai de Baltasar Porcel.
 Una nit d'estiu.
 L'entrevista impossible, Jacint Verdaguer.

Foreign language works 
 1989 Baleares
 1994 Viajes expectantes. De Marrakech a Pekín.
 2004 Geografías expectantes

References

External links
 

Spanish male writers
Writers from Catalonia
Catalan-language writers
Premi d'Honor de les Lletres Catalanes winners
1937 births
2009 deaths
20th-century Spanish journalists